Saalmulleria stumpffi is a moth in the family Cossidae. It is found in Madagascar.

References

Natural History Museum Lepidoptera generic names catalog

Metarbelinae
Moths described in 1884
Taxa named by Max Saalmüller